In mathematics, Richardson's theorem establishes the undecidability of the equality of real numbers defined by expressions involving integers,  and exponential and sine functions. It was proved in 1968 by mathematician and computer scientist Daniel Richardson of the University of Bath.

Specifically, the class of expressions for which the theorem holds is that generated by rational numbers, the number π, the number ln 2, the variable x, the operations of addition, subtraction, multiplication, composition, and the sin, exp, and abs functions.

For some classes of expressions (generated by other primitives than in Richardson's theorem) there exist algorithms that can determine whether an expression is zero.

Statement of the theorem
Richardson's theorem can be stated as follows:  
Let E be a set of expressions that represent  functions. Suppose that E includes these expressions:
 x (representing the identity function)
 ex (representing the exponential functions)
 sin x (representing the sin function)
 all rational numbers, ln 2, and π (representing constant functions that ignore their input and produce the given number as output)
Suppose E is also closed under a few standard operations. Specifically, suppose that if A and B are in E, then all of the following are also in E:
 A + B (representing the pointwise addition of the functions that A and B represent)
 A − B (representing pointwise subtraction)
 AB (representing pointwise multiplication)
 A∘B (representing the composition of the functions represented by A and B)
Then the following decision problems are unsolvable:
 Deciding whether an expression A in E represents a function that is nonnegative everywhere
 If E includes also the expression |x| (representing the absolute value function), deciding whether an expression A in E represents a function that is zero everywhere
 If E includes an expression B representing a function whose antiderivative has no representative in E, deciding whether an expression A in E represents a function whose antiderivative can be represented in E. (Example:  has an antiderivative in the elementary functions if and only if .)

Extensions
After Hilbert's tenth problem was solved in 1970, B. F. Caviness observed that the use of ex and ln 2 could be removed.
Wang later noted that under the same assumptions under which the question of whether there was x with A(x) < 0 was insolvable, the question of whether there was x with A(x) = 0 was also insolvable.

Miklós Laczkovich removed also the need for π and reduced the use of composition.  In particular, given an expression A(x) in the ring generated by the integers, x, sin xn, and sin(x sin xn) (for n ranging over positive integers), both the question of whether A(x) > 0 for some x and whether A(x) = 0 for some x are unsolvable.

By contrast, the Tarski–Seidenberg theorem says that the first-order theory of the real field is decidable, so it is not possible to remove the sine function entirely.

See also

References

Further reading

External links

 

Computability theory
Functions and mappings
Theorems in the foundations of mathematics